James Rudkin (born 7 July 1994) is a British rower. Rudkin attended Stowe School.

He won a silver medal in the eight at the 2019 European Rowing Championships. He won a bronze medal at the 2018 World Rowing Championships in Plovdiv, Bulgaria, as part of the eight with Alan Sinclair, Tom Ransley, Thomas George, Moe Sbihi, Oliver Wynne-Griffith, Matthew Tarrant, Will Satch and Henry Fieldman. He won another bronze medal the following year at the 2019 World Rowing Championships in Ottensheim, Austria as part of the eight with George, Josh Bugajski, Sbihi, Jacob Dawson, Wynne-Griffith, Tarrant, Thomas Ford and Fieldman.

In 2021, he won a European gold medal in the eight in Varese, Italy.

References

External links

James Rudkin at British Rowing

Living people
1994 births
British male rowers
World Rowing Championships medalists for Great Britain
Rowers at the 2020 Summer Olympics
Medalists at the 2020 Summer Olympics
Olympic medalists in rowing
Olympic bronze medallists for Great Britain
21st-century British people
People educated at Stowe School